Ludwig Drums is a United States musical instrument manufacturer, focused on percussion. The brand achieved significant popularity in the 1960s due to the endorsement of the Beatles drummer Ringo Starr. It is a subsidiary of Conn-Selmer.

Products manufactured by Ludwig include timpani, drum kits, and drum hardware. The company also makes keyboard percussion instruments, such as marimbas, vibraphones, and xylophones, through the Ludwig-Musser brand.

History 
The Ludwig Drum Company was established in 1909 by William F. & Theobald Ludwig, sons of a German immigrant to the United States. William Jr. had been a professional drummer, playing with circuses and touring vaudeville shows, along with the occasional skating-rink gig. Since this work was irregular, he and his brother, Theobald, opened a drum shop in Chicago; they called it Ludwig & Ludwig. The company started with a concept for the design and manufacture of a functional bass drum pedal.

The company added new products to its catalog, such as snare drums and timpani, in 1916. In 1917, Ludwig signed a deal to build rope-tensioned snare drums to support World War I. Theobald Ludwig died in 1918, and William continued on his own.

In the late 1920s, the company was sold to the C.G. Conn instrument company. William Ludwig stayed on to run the company for Conn (which also owned the Leedy Manufacturing Company at this time). Eventually, William Ludwig decided to leave Conn and start a new company of his own. He was unable to use the Ludwig name since that trademark now belonged to Conn who continued to market Ludwig & Ludwig drums.

In 1937, William bought a factory building and started The WFL Drum Company (his initials). The company continued producing drums at a small scale for the duration of World War II, but William got back to the idea of making the company a large drum manufacturer after the war ended. WFL was a competitor with Ludwig and Ludwig. Conn combined their two drum brands into one in the early 1950s, forming Leedy & Ludwig, and then decided to quit the drum business altogether. In 1955, William and his son Bill Jr. were able to buy the Ludwig trademark back from Conn, and over the next few years their company and its products transitioned from the WFL brand to being called "Ludwig" again.

Despite initial success, Ludwig's global breakthrough would occur February 9, 1964, when The Beatles made their historic American TV debut on The Ed Sullivan Show. The Ludwig logo, displayed on the front of Ringo Starr's bass drum, could be seen by the television audience of about seventy-three million people. As it happens, Starr chose that brand upon joining the band simply because he liked the oyster pearl black color of the drum kit he chose.

The publicity resulted in Ludwig's sales doubling quickly to $13 million, which prompted production to increase to a 24/7 production as the company became the foremost drum manufacturer in North America for twenty years.

Ludwig acquired the Musser Mallet Company, a manufacturer of xylophones, marimbas and vibraphones, in 1965. Ludwig was a strong presence in the marching drum market. During the 1970s, Ludwig's "Challenger" line of snare drums offered sophisticated tuning and strong build quality.  Ludwig drums were used by many leading drum and bugle corps.

On 4 November 1981, William F Ludwig II sold the business to the Selmer Company (now Conn-Selmer). Selmer closed the Damen Avenue factory in the ensuing years and moved the drum production business to Monroe, North Carolina, in 1984. In 2002, Ludwig merged with Conn-Selmer, becoming a brand of Conn-Selmer, Inc.

The Musser manufacturing facility remained in LaGrange, Illinois, until 2013, and was then moved to Elkhart, Indiana.

Gallery

References

External links

 
 NAMM Oral History Interview with William F Ludwig II July 9, 2002
 NAMM Oral History Interview with William F. Ludwig III January 16, 2009

Percussion instrument manufacturing companies
Musical instrument manufacturing companies of the United States
Manufacturing companies based in North Carolina
American companies established in 1909
Manufacturing companies established in 1909
The Beatles' musical instruments